Paul Adey (born August 28, 1963) is a former ice hockey player and coach. Adey enjoyed a notable playing career in British ice hockey, playing 11 seasons for the Nottingham Panthers between 1988 and 1999 and 29 games for the Sheffield Steelers during the 2000–01 season. His number 22 jersey is retired by the Panthers and he is a member of the British Ice Hockey Hall of Fame.

Playing career
Born in Montreal, Quebec, Canada, Adey joined the Hull Olympiques in the Quebec Major Junior Hockey League in 1981 at the age of 18, moving to the Shawinigan Cataractes in 1983. His professional career began in International Hockey League with the Toledo Goaldiggers before he moved to the Fort Wayne Komets. After three seasons he moved to the Peoria Rivermen before moving to Europe in 1988. He began the 1988–89 season with Ligue Magnus side Briançon but in October joined the Nottingham Panthers in the British Hockey League. He played for the club for the next 11 seasons, finishing as the top point scorer on five occasions and setting club records for goals, assists, and points, surpassing the records previously held by Chick Zamick. Adey helped the team to the Playoff Championship in his first season and won four Autumn Cup winners medals with the team.

Adey departed for Italy in 1999 having scored 828 goals, 781 assists and 1,609 points in 609 appearances for the Panthers. In 2000–01 Adey was a mid-season signing for Nottingham's archrivals, the Sheffield Steelers. He scored 11 goals and earned 12 assists in 29 games for the Steelers, helping the club to a Grand Slam of all four cups. He retired from playing at the end of the 2000–01 season. However, whilst coaching, he played as an injury cover twice in the 2001–02 season and once in the 2003–04 season.

Coaching career
Following his retirement as a player in 2001, Adey returned to Nottingham as a coach under director of hockey Alex Dampier. In 2002 he assumed the role of head coach after Dampier's dismissal. Adey presided over the Panthers for three seasons, leading the club the Challenge Cup in 2004, their first trophy since 1998. Following the 2004–05 season, Adey's contract was not renewed. In the summer of 2006 he became the head coach of Italian side Renon Ritten. He was retained for the 2007–08 season. He became coach of the Belfast Giants in the Elite Ice Hockey League for the 2013–2014 season, and helped bring them the League Cup and to the final of the Challenge Cup and the playoffs. He also won coach of the year that season. However, there was a lot of controversy when he was not retained to be coach in the following season. A statement released by Belfast Giants said 'that Adey and general manager Todd Kelman had failed to come to an agreement for next season and mutually decided to part ways'. Fans were shocked by this move by Kelman and the controversy continued when Kelman then left his general manager role at the Giants to buy the Cardiff Devils for the next season.

Awards
 Named to the ISL All-star first team 1997 and 1999.
 Sekonda Face to Watch in January 1999.
 World Championships Pool B Silver medallist 1999.
 Jersey number (22) retired by Nottingham Panthers in 2003.
 Inducted to the British Ice Hockey Hall of Fame in 2006.

Records
 All-time points record for Nottingham Panthers with 1609.

Career statistics

Regular season and playoffs

International

Coaching career

References
 
 British Hockey Hall of Fame
 Nottingham Panthers official site
 Panthers History
 Rouen Hockey Elite 76

https://www.bbc.co.uk/sport/ice-hockey/26981677

1963 births
Living people
British Ice Hockey Hall of Fame inductees
Canadian people of English descent
Diables Rouges de Briançon players
Fort Wayne Komets players
Hull Olympiques players
Ice hockey people from Montreal
Peoria Rivermen (IHL) players
Nottingham Panthers players
Nottingham Panthers coaches
Shawinigan Cataractes players
Sheffield Steelers players
Toledo Goaldiggers players
Anglophone Quebec people
Canadian expatriate ice hockey players in England
Canadian expatriate ice hockey players in France
Canadian ice hockey right wingers
Canadian expatriate sportspeople in Switzerland
Canadian expatriate ice hockey players in Italy
Canadian expatriate ice hockey players in the United States
British expatriate ice hockey people
British expatriate sportspeople in Italy
British expatriate sportspeople in Switzerland
British ice hockey coaches
Naturalised citizens of the United Kingdom
Canadian emigrants to England
Naturalised sports competitors
British ice hockey right wingers